is a former governor of Fukushima Prefecture, Japan. He was first elected in November 2006, after the previous governor, Eisaku Satō, was forced to step down after bribery charges. He chose not to seek a third term in the election held in October 2014, stating that he had made a mark on addressing the problems that Fukushima faced following the 2011 Tōhoku earthquake and tsunami and the resulting nuclear disaster, and that further rehabilitation efforts should take place under a new leader.

References 

Members of the House of Councillors (Japan)
Politicians from Fukushima Prefecture
1947 births
Living people
Governors of Fukushima Prefecture